Globen metro station is on the Green line of the Stockholm metro and the Tvärbanan light rail line, located by Globen in Johanneshov, Söderort. The station was opened on 1 October 1930 as Slakthuset station (named after an old abattoir around the area that has since been converted into a nightclub) as a part of the stretch between Gullmarsplan and Stureby. In 1958 the station was renamed as Isstadion station (after the nearby Johanneshovs Isstadion, now known as Hovet). The station acquired its current name on 20 August 1989 and is the only one in the system to have had more than two names. There is a track connection to Tvärbanan just north of Globen metro station, and Tvärbanan has track connection to the railway, which is used for deliveries of new metro trains.

According to plans presented in the spring of 2015, this station and the adjacent Enskede gård station, which are both above ground, will be replaced by a single underground metro station called  in the future. This change will be made when this branch of the Green line is to be transferred to be a branch of the Blue line when the latter line is extended to the south side of the city, expected to be completed sometime in 2030.

References

External links

Images of Globen station

Green line (Stockholm metro) stations
Railway stations opened in 1930